Jean-Charles-Alexandre Moreau (1762–1810) was a French history painter, decorative painter and architect. He was born in Rimaucourt near Neufchâteau, Vosges. He studied architecture in Paris with Louis-François Trouard and won the first prize in architecture in the Prix de Rome competition of 1785. He visited Rome four times during his career. Later he studied history painting with Jacques-Louis David. From 1797 to 1810, he exhibited at the Paris Salon. In 1798 he renovated the theatre of the Comédie-Française. According to his entry in the Benezit Dictionary of Artists, Moreau died in 1810 in Paris. However, the German Wikipedia cites a study published in 2014, which shows he is identical to a French architect, who in 1803 moved to Austria, where he was known as Karl Moreau, had a very productive career, and died in 1840 (see :de:Charles de Moreau).

Notes

Bibliography
 Benezit (2006). "Moreau, Charles", vol. 9, p. 1276, in Benezit Dictionary of Artists. Paris: Gründ. .
 Lemonnier, Henry (1926). Procès-verbaux de l'Académie royale d'architecture 1671–1793, volume 9 (1780–1793). Paris: Armand Colin. Title page at Internet Archive.
 Wild, Nicole (2012). Dictionnaire des théâtres parisiens (1807–1914). Lyon: Symétrie. . .

1762 births
1810 deaths
18th-century French architects
19th-century French architects
French painters